Rrahim Çota was a member of the Assembly of the Republic of Albania for the Democratic Party of Albania.

References

Living people
Democratic Party of Albania politicians
Year of birth missing (living people)
Members of the Parliament of Albania
21st-century Albanian politicians